Memories Sing Along with Mitch is an album by Mitch Miller & The Gang. It was released in 1960 on the Columbia label (catalog nos. CL-1542 and CS-8342).

The album debuted on Billboard magazine's popular albums chart on October 31, 1960, peaked at No. 5, and remained on that chart for 25 weeks. It was certified as a gold record by the RIAA.

AllMusic later gave the album a rating of two stars.

Track listing
Side 1
 "My Blue Heaven" (G. Whiting, W. Donaldson)
 Medley: "I'm Nobody's Baby" and "You Were Meant for Me"
 Medley: "At Sundown" (W. Donaldson) and "Five Foot Two, Eyes of Blue"
 Medley: "Meet Me in St. Louis, Louis" (arranged by Jimmy Carroll) and "Bill Bailey, Won't You Please Come Home" (arranged by Jimmy Carroll)
 Medley: "The Bowery" (arranged by Jimmy Carroll) and "The Yankee Doodle Boy" (George M. Cohan)
 Medley: "I'm Going Back to Dixie" (L.L. Riker) and "Dixie" (L.L. Riker)

Side 2
 Medley: "Honey" and "Sleepy Time Gal"
 "Ramona"
 Medley: "Peg O' My Heart" and "Peggy O'Neill"
 "I Love You"
 "Home on the Range" (arranged by Jimmy Carroll)
 "Battle Hymn of the Republic" (arranged by Jimmy Carroll)

References

1960 albums
Columbia Records albums
Mitch Miller albums